Virginia's Husband may refer to:

 Virginia's Husband (play)
 Virginia's Husband (1928 film), a 1928 British silent comedy film 
 Virginia's Husband (1934 film), a 1934 British comedy film